Nasarkhasiabad (also Romanized as Nasārkhāṣīābād) is a village in Suri Rural District, Suri District, Rumeshkhan County, Lorestan Province, Iran. It lies between the villages of Azizabad to the north-west, and Padarvand-e Sofla to the southeast. At the 2006 census, its population was 558, in 109 families.

References 

Populated places in Rumeshkhan County